Simon Woodhead (born 26 December 1962) is an English former footballer who played in the Football League for Mansfield Town.

References

English footballers
English Football League players
1962 births
Living people
Mansfield Town F.C. players
Shepshed Dynamo F.C. players
Association football defenders